Hannibal Amir Buress (born February 4, 1983) is an American comedian, actor, rapper, producer, and writer. He started performing comedy in 2002 while attending Southern Illinois University.  He starred on Adult Swim's The Eric Andre Show from 2012 to 2020, and was featured on Comedy Central's Broad City from 2014 to 2019. He is also known for bringing Bill Cosby’s sexual abuse of women back into the public spotlight during a stand-up routine.

Early life
Hannibal Amir Buress was born in Chicago, Illinois, on February 4, 1983, the son of teacher Margaret and John Buress, a Union Pacific Railroad employee. He was raised in the Austin neighborhood of Chicago. He was named after Carthaginian general Hannibal, and has told stories in his stand-up act about his name causing women to turn him down because of its association with fictional cannibal Hannibal Lecter. After attending Steinmetz College Prep, he attended Southern Illinois University Carbondale for four years but did not graduate. While there he became friends with hip hop artist Open Mike Eagle.

Career

Buress began his stand-up career at an open mic in 2002. He has been featured in The Awkward Comedy Show special on Comedy Central, and alongside comics Baron Vaughn, Eric André, Marina Franklin, and Victor Varnado, and on the FX sitcom Louie. From 2012 to 2020, he co-starred as Eric André's sidekick on The Eric Andre Show. In July 2010, Buress made Variety magazine's "Ten Comics to Watch in 2010" list.

His first stand-up comedy album My Name is Hannibal was released on July 27, 2010.

Buress was a writer on Saturday Night Live from 2009 to 2010. He left with only one of his sketches having aired. In September 2010, he began writing for the fifth season of the NBC comedy series 30 Rock. He left after six months, although he continued to portray various characters on the show for 9 episodes from 2010 to 2012 such as "Gus", "Homeless Guy" and "Bum".

He released his second album, Animal Furnace, in 2012, which also aired as a special on Comedy Central. The album received positive reviews.

His stand-up comedy has been featured on Comedy Central programs such as Live at Gotham and John Oliver's New York Stand-Up Show. He has also performed on several late night talkshows such as The Late Late Show with Craig Ferguson, Lopez Tonight, Russell Howard's Good News, Late Night with Jimmy Fallon, The Tonight Show Starring Jimmy Fallon, Late Show with David Letterman, Jimmy Kimmel Live!, Totally Biased with W. Kamau Bell, and Conan. Additionally, he performed a set at the 2012 Secret Policeman's Ball at Radio City Music Hall in New York City.

An hourlong Comedy Central show, Hannibal Buress Live from Chicago, aired on March 29, 2014.

He used to host a weekly stand-up comedy show at The Knitting Factory on Sunday evenings in Brooklyn, New York. In October 2016, Buress began a podcast called Handsome Rambler.

Buress played Coach Wilson in the 2017 Marvel movie Spider-Man: Homecoming. Buress paid a lookalike who didn't look like him to attend the film's premiere in his place, because he was busy with the film Tag. He got in contact with the lookalike when he did a video for the MTV Movie Awards.

On February 8, 2020, he appeared on The Bob Ross Challenge, painting for the first time, coming up with the art nickname 7.

He had a comedy special for Cornell University via Zoom on April 17 at 9 pm exclusive to the students.

Buress was one of many collaborators on 'Foam and Flotsam,' a comedy album by Chelsea Peretti about coffee. The EP was released on April 21, 2020.

On April 30, 2020, he released a single called Judge Judy, paying homage to the series of the same name after it was announced that the show would end in 2021.

Bill Cosby routine 

On October 16, 2014, at the Philadelphia club The Trocadero, Buress was recorded doing an extended routine about sexual assault allegations against comedian Bill Cosby. Buress addressed Cosby's legacy of "talk[ing] down" to young black men about their style of dress and lifestyle. Buress criticized the actor's public moralizing by saying, "Yeah, but you raped women, Bill Cosby, so that kind of brings you down a couple notches." When the audience responded to Buress's accusation with incredulity (Philadelphia being Cosby's home town), he encouraged everyone to search for "Bill Cosby rape" on Google when they got home.

Buress had been doing the same Cosby routine for the previous six months with little response, but the October performance went viral after being posted on the website of Philadelphia magazine. A media firestorm ensued, with numerous publications tackling the question of how Cosby had managed to maintain, as Buress called it in his set, a "Teflon image" despite more than a decade of public sexual abuse accusations.

Comedian Eddie Murphy later referenced Buress's role in the allegations coming to light while impersonating Cosby during his 2015 Mark Twain Prize for American Humor acceptance speech, mockingly playing Cosby as threatening Buress's life.

Personal life
After living in New York City, Buress moved back to his hometown of Chicago in 2017 and settled in its Wicker Park neighborhood. Buress is a fan of the Chicago White Sox.

In December 2017, Buress was arrested in Miami for disorderly intoxication. Bystander footage of the arrest showed Buress mocking the police officers and demanding to know why he was being arrested. The arrest report revealed that Buress was detained because he approached the police officers and would not stop asking them to call an Uber for him. Buress later stated, "I asked the [officer] to call me an Uber, and he said, 'No.' He told me to leave the street. I go into this bar to get a phone charger for an Uber. He follows me into the bar, and told me I'm too drunk to go inside. [...] 'If I can't be on the street, where do you want me to be?' I ask him. I was in a state of trying to get home. [...] I don't really believe I was at fault." The case was later dismissed. The Miami New Times reported that the arresting officer has an alleged history of violence and was previously disciplined by internal affairs for an alcohol-fueled assault. The report was included by Buress in a televised stand-up routine he did at the Olympia Theater in Miami, in August 2019. In July 2020, Buress brought a lawsuit against the City of Miami and the officers involved for constitutional violations in connection with the incident. The case is currently proceeding in the United States District Court for the Southern District of Florida.

Buress stated in a September 2018 interview that he had "quit drinking" after a number of "different situations [happened] that were alcohol fuelled," such as "arguments" stating that the ways he had handled things "were not smooth, just messy shit."

Buress owns a building in Chicago and in 2017 removed residential tenants in order to convert the property into Airbnb short-term rental units. In October 2019 he posted a tweet against Bernie Sanders' call for rent control and asked for donations to an Illinois landlords association, leading to Twitter users criticizing him with the phrase "Hannibal Buress is a landlord". Buress later stated that he regretted his now-deleted tweets, which he claimed were jokes meant to stir up controversy. He attributed the criticism he received to fallout over comments he made on Bernie Sanders' age. Buress also said a housing charity had refused his $4,000 donation due to his perceived landlord advocacy. 

Buress has a one-year old daughter.

Filmography

Film

Television

Web series

Video games

Discography

Albums/comedy specials
 My Name Is Hannibal (2010)
 Animal Furnace (2012)
 Live from Chicago (2014)
 Comedy Camisado (2016)
 Hannibal Takes Edinburgh (2016)
 Miami Nights (2020)

Guest appearances

Singles
Judge Judy (2020)

Awards and nominations

References

Further reading

External links

 
 

1983 births
21st-century American comedians
21st-century American male actors
African-American atheists
African-American media personalities
African-American male actors
African-American male comedians
African-American screenwriters
African-American stand-up comedians
American atheists
American male comedians
American male film actors
American male television actors
American television writers
American podcasters
American stand-up comedians
Comedians from Illinois
Critics of religions
Living people
Male actors from Chicago
American male television writers
Screenwriters from Illinois
Southern Illinois University Carbondale alumni
Writers from Chicago
Stand Up! Records artists
21st-century American screenwriters
Shorty Award winners
21st-century American male writers
21st-century African-American writers
20th-century African-American people
African-American male writers